Georgi Velikov Pashov (born 4 March 1990) is a Bulgarian professional footballer who plays as a  right-back for Liga I club Petrolul Ploiești.

Club career

On 20 July 2017, Pashov signed a 2-year contract with Lokomotiv Plovdiv.

On 5 January 2018, Pashov joined Etar where he played regularly, but his contract was terminated in June by mutual consent.

In June 2018, Pashov signed a two year contract with Armenian club Ararat-Armenia. In January 2020, he moved to Zhetysu in the Kazakhstan Premier League, with the contract to run for one season. However, as football in Kazakhstan was suspended on numerous occasions due to the COVID-19 pandemic, he did not get to play in any official matches for the team. In August 2020, Pashov joined Romanian team Academica Clinceni.

International career
In August 2019 Pashov received his first call up for Bulgaria for the UEFA Euro 2020 Qualification match against England and the friendly match against Ireland on 7 and 10 September, making his debut in the latter match held on 10 September, playing the full 90 minutes.

Personal life
Pashov is Bulgarian on his father's side and Ukrainian through his mother, while also having some African ancestry on his maternal lineage.

Career statistics

Club

International

Statistics accurate as of match played 14 October 2019

Honours
Montana
B Group: 2014–15

Ararat-Armenia
Armenian Premier League: 2018–19
Armenian Super Cup: 2018–19

Petrolul Ploiești
Liga II: 2021–22

References

External links

1990 births
Living people
Footballers from Plovdiv
Bulgarian people of Ukrainian descent
Bulgarian footballers
Bulgaria youth international footballers
Bulgaria under-21 international footballers
Bulgaria international footballers
FC Chavdar Etropole players
PFC Slavia Sofia players
FC Montana players
PFC Lokomotiv Plovdiv players
SFC Etar Veliko Tarnovo players
FC Ararat-Armenia players
LPS HD Clinceni players
FC Petrolul Ploiești players
First Professional Football League (Bulgaria) players
Second Professional Football League (Bulgaria) players
Liga I players
Liga II players
Bulgarian expatriate footballers
Bulgarian expatriate sportspeople in Armenia
Expatriate footballers in Armenia
Bulgarian expatriate sportspeople in Romania
Expatriate footballers in Romania
Association football fullbacks